Afterword is a literary device. It may also refer to:

 After Words, a TV series
 Afterwords (The Gathering album)
 Afterwords (Collective Soul album)
 "Afterword", song from  Paper Anniversary (album)